Orthotylus flavosparsus is a species of plant-eating bug in the Miridae family, which is found everywhere in Europe except for Albania and Iceland. It was introduced to North America.

Description

Ecology
The species can be found on oraches and chenopods, which is their main food.

References

External links
 

Insects described in 1841
Hemiptera of Europe
flavosparsus